The 2001 Stanley Cup playoffs, the playoff tournament of the National Hockey League (NHL), began on April 11, 2001, and ended on June 9, 2001, when the Western Conference champion  Colorado Avalanche defeated the Eastern Conference champion New Jersey Devils to win their second Stanley Cup.

Defenceman Ray Bourque, who had a 21-year tenure in Boston, won his first Stanley Cup in his final professional year. Joe Sakic, Swedish center Peter Forsberg, defenceman Rob Blake, and goalkeeper Patrick Roy claimed the Stanley Cup for the final time in their careers. Roy was also awarded the Conn Smythe Trophy, his third, the most by any player. No hat tricks were scored in the 2001 playoffs and goaltenders combined for a record 19 shutouts. This was the first of ten consecutive seasons in which the Florida Panthers missed the playoffs, which became the longest playoff drought in NHL history (later equaled by the Edmonton Oilers); the record stood until the Buffalo Sabres surpassed it in 2022.

Playoff seeds

Eastern Conference
New Jersey Devils, Atlantic Division champions, Eastern Conference regular season champions – 111 points
Ottawa Senators, Northeast Division champions – 109 points
Washington Capitals, Southeast Division champions – 96 points
Philadelphia Flyers – 100 points
Buffalo Sabres – 98 points
Pittsburgh Penguins – 96 points
Toronto Maple Leafs – 90 points
Carolina Hurricanes – 88 points

Western Conference
Colorado Avalanche, Northwest Division champions, Western Conference regular season champions, Presidents' Trophy winners – 118 points
Detroit Red Wings, Central Division champions – 111 points
Dallas Stars, Pacific Division champions – 106 points
St. Louis Blues – 103 points
San Jose Sharks – 95 points
Edmonton Oilers – 93 points
Los Angeles Kings – 92 points
Vancouver Canucks – 90 points

Playoff bracket

Conference Quarterfinals

Eastern Conference Quarterfinals

(1) New Jersey Devils vs. (8) Carolina Hurricanes

This was the first playoff meeting between these two teams. New Jersey won this year's four-game regular season series earning five of eight points.

In their next four playoff appearances the Hurricanes did not lose a series in the first two rounds of the playoffs again until 2020.

(2) Ottawa Senators vs. (7) Toronto Maple Leafs
This was the second consecutive playoff meeting and second postseason match-up between these two teams. Their only previous series was in the previous year's Eastern Conference Quarterfinals, which Toronto won in six games. Ottawa won all five games during this year's regular season series.

(3) Washington Capitals vs. (6) Pittsburgh Penguins

This was the second consecutive postseason meeting and the seventh playoff match-up between these two rivals; with Pittsburgh winning five of the six previous series. They last met in the previous year's Eastern Conference Quarterfinals, which Pittsburgh won in five games. These teams split this year's four-game regular season series.

(4) Philadelphia Flyers vs. (5) Buffalo Sabres
This was the second consecutive playoff meeting and seventh postseason match-up between these two teams; with Philadelphia winning five of the six previous series. They last met in the previous year's Eastern Conference Quarterfinals which Philadelphia won in five games. Philadelphia won all four games during this year's regular season series.

In the first period of game one, Dominik Hasek made a save on Mark Recchi's penalty shot opportunity.

Western Conference Quarterfinals

(1) Colorado Avalanche vs. (8) Vancouver Canucks

This was the second playoff meeting between these two teams. Their only previous meeting was in the 1996 Western Conference Quarterfinals, which Colorado won in six games. Colorado won three of the five games during this year's regular season series. This was Vancouver's first playoff appearance since 1996.

(2) Detroit Red Wings vs. (7) Los Angeles Kings
This was the second consecutive playoff meeting and second postseason match-up between these two teams. Their only previous meeting was in the previous year's Western Conference Quarterfinals, which Detroit won in a four-game sweep. These teams split this year's three-game regular season series.

(3) Dallas Stars vs. (6) Edmonton Oilers
This was the fifth consecutive playoff meeting and seventh overall postseason match-up between these two teams; with Dallas winning four of the six previous series. Dallas won last year's Western Conference Quarterfinals in five games. Dallas won three of the four games in this year's regular season series.

(4) St. Louis Blues vs. (5) San Jose Sharks
This was the second consecutive playoff meeting and second postseason match-up between these two teams. San Jose won last year's Western Conference Quarterfinals in seven games. St. Louis won the four-game regular season series earning five of eight points.

Conference Semifinals

Eastern Conference Semifinals

(1) New Jersey Devils vs. (7) Toronto Maple Leafs
This was the second consecutive playoff meeting and second postseason match-up between these two teams. New Jersey won last year's Eastern Conference Semifinals in six games. These teams split this year's three-game regular season series.

In game one, Nik Antropov scored the game-winning goal in the second period, while Curtis Joseph saved all 32 shots by the Devils. In game two, the Leafs led by one goal going into the second period. The Devils scored four consecutive goals against Joseph, one each by Gomez, Rafalski, Mogilny and Madden. The Maple Leafs' Sundin scored a short-handed goal 29 seconds into the third period, and the Devils' Mogilny scored a power-play goal 38 seconds after that. The Leafs' Thomas and Sundin combined to score three goals, and the game required overtime, during which the Devils' Randy McKay scored the game-winning goal. In game three, Rafalski scored the game-winning goal off a deflection in overtime. The Devils recorded 17 more shots than Toronto. In game four, Toronto's Corson scored in the first period, and Berezin and Mats Sundin scored in the second. The Devils' Elias scored a power-play goal in the second period. Maple Leafs' forward Tie Domi checked Devils defenceman Scott Niedermayer, who left the ice rink on a stretcher. In game five, Leafs' defenceman Cory Cross initiated scoring early in the second period, and Devils' right winger Petr Sykora and center Jason Arnott scored one goal each. In the third period, Toronto's Tomas Kaberle scored a goal. In game six, Brian Rafalski scored the game-winning goal for the Devils. In game seven, the Devils' Patrik Elias scored two goals in the second period.

(5) Buffalo Sabres vs. (6) Pittsburgh Penguins

This was the second playoff meeting between these two teams; with Pittsburgh winning the only previous meeting in the 1979 Preliminary Round in three games. Pittsburgh won three of the four games in this year's regular season series.

In game one, Penguins centre Mario Lemieux scored the game-winning goal in the first period. Centres Wayne Primeau and Jan Hrdina also scored. Penguins winger Jaromir Jagr, who assisted on the Lemieux goal in the first period, injured his leg in the third period and did not play in game two. In game two, the Penguins' Robert Lang, Ference and Kovalev scored goals. Sabres centre Stu Barnes scored. In game three, Sabres defenceman Jason Woolley scored the game-winning goal. His teammates Curtis Brown, Miroslav Satan and James Patrick also scored. In game four, Stu Barnes scored two goals, including the game-winning goal. Buffalo's Jean-Pierre Dumont and Curtis Brown also scored. The Penguins' Martin Straka and Janne Laukkanen scored. In game five, Stu Barnes scored the game-winning goal in overtime. His teammates Chris Gratton and Curtis Brown also scored goals. The Penguins' Jaromir Jagr and Aleksey Morozov scored. Martin Straka had an unsuccessful penalty shot. In game six, Martin Straka scored the game-winning goal in overtime. His teammates Mario Lemieux and Alexei Kovalev also scored. Buffalo's Maxim Afinogenov and Donald Audette scored for the Sabres. In game seven, Penguins defenceman Darius Kasparaitis scored the game-winning goal in overtime. Pittsburgh's Andrew Ference and Robert Lang also scored. Buffalo's Jean-Pierre Dumont and Steve Heinze scored for the Sabres.

Western Conference Semifinals

(1) Colorado Avalanche vs. (7) Los Angeles Kings

This was the first playoff meeting between these two teams. These teams split this year's four-game regular season series.

In game one, the Avalanche took two minor penalties, one of which led to the game-winning power play goal by Kings defenceman Jaroslav Modry. In game three, Avalanche centre Joe Sakic injured his shoulder and would sit out part of the series. Game six featured 65 shots and one goal, scored by Kings winger Glen Murray in the second overtime.

(3) Dallas Stars vs. (4) St. Louis Blues
This was the twelfth playoff meeting between these two teams; with Dallas winning six of the eleven previous series. They last met in the 1999 Western Conference Semifinals, which Dallas won in six games. St. Louis won this year's three-game regular season series earning four of six points.

Dallas was swept for the first time since relocating from Minnesota; the franchise had not been swept since 1984 when the Minnesota North Stars were swept by the Edmonton Oilers. Game two was the last game played in the Reunion Arena.

Conference Finals

Eastern Conference Final

(1) New Jersey Devils vs. (6) Pittsburgh Penguins

This was the fifth playoff meeting between these two teams; with Pittsburgh winning three of the four previous series. They last met in the 1999 Eastern Conference Quarterfinals where Pittsburgh won in seven games. This was New Jersey's second consecutive and fifth overall appearance in the Conference Finals; they defeated the Philadelphia Flyers in seven games in the previous year's Eastern Conference Final. This was Pittsburgh's fourth appearance in the Conference Finals; they last made it to the Conference Finals in 1996, where they lost to the Florida Panthers in seven games. Pittsburgh won this year's five-game regular season series by earning seven of ten points.

Game three was Martin Brodeur's eleventh career postseason shutout, and it was also the first home shutout loss for the Penguins since 1975. In game four, Martin Brodeur recorded his twelfth career playoff shutout.

Western Conference Final

(1) Colorado Avalanche vs. (4) St. Louis Blues

This was the first playoff meeting between these two teams. This was Colorado's third consecutive and seventh overall appearance in the Conference Finals; they lost to the Dallas Stars in seven games during the previous year's Western Conference Final. St. Louis made their second Conference Finals appearance; they last made it to the Conference Finals in 1986 where they lost to the Calgary Flames in seven games. Colorado won this year's four-game regular season series by earning six of eight points.

In game one, Joe Sakic's penalty shot goal was awarded when Blues goaltender Roman Turek was ruled to have thrown his stick.

Stanley Cup Finals

This was the first playoff meeting between these two teams. Colorado made its second Finals appearance and first since defeating the Florida Panthers in a four-game sweep in 1996. New Jersey made its second consecutive and third overall Finals appearance after defeating the Dallas Stars the year before. It was the first Finals match-up to feature both regular season conference champions since 1989. New Jersey won both games in this year's regular season series. This would be last time when the Colorado Avalanche have won Stanley Cup Finals until 2022

Playoff statistics

Skaters
Colorado Avalanche captain Joe Sakic led the playoffs in scoring for the second time in his career. Patrik Elias of the New Jersey Devils finished second in playoff scoring with 23 points. The table lists the top 10 point producers.

Goaltenders
The following table lists goaltenders with at least 420 minutes.

See also
2000–01 NHL season
List of NHL seasons

References

Stanley Cup playoffs
playoffs